Pericle is a 2016 Italian crime film directed by Stefano Mordini. It was screened in the Un Certain Regard section at the 2016 Cannes Film Festival.

Plot   
Pericle is the henchman of Don Pietro, the boss of a powerful Camorra gang based in Belgium. His specialty is sodomizing victims, compelling their submission to the will of the organization. After making a fatal mistake during a punitive mission, he finds himself sentenced to death, and is forced to escape to France, where an unexpected encounter makes him reflect on his life.

Cast   
 Riccardo Scamarcio as Pericle
 Marina Foïs as Anastasia
 Gigio Morra as  Don Luigi
 Nissim Renard as Vincent
 Valentina Acca as  Anna
 Lou Lambrecht as Stella
 Maria Luisa Santella  as Signorinella
 Lucia Ragni as Aunt Nenè

Reception

Pericle grossed $167,439 at the box office.

See also  
 List of Italian films of 2016

References

External links

2016 films
2016 crime films
Films directed by Stefano Mordini
Italian crime films
2010s Italian-language films
2010s Italian films